Harsol (also spelled Harsola, ancient Harshapura) is a small town in the Talod taluka of the Sabarkantha district of Gujarat, India. This town has its importance for Harsol inscription, which is related with the Paramara King Siyaka II (also called Harsha).

The Harsola Vanik Samaj is also originated from the Harsol and later they expanded to other districts of Gujarat and nearby states of Maharashtra and Madhya Pradesh.

Harsola Vanik ( हरसोला वणिक ) is a Hindu sub-group of the Vanik caste.

They are strictly vegetarian in diet and follow Vaishnavism. Most of Harsola Vaishnavas are the followers of Vallabhacharya and ensue Pushtimarg.

Surnames of people associated with Harsola Vanik Samaj can be Harsola, Shah, Mehta, Saraf, Shroff, Doshi, Wani, Modi, Gandhi, Desai etc.

References

Cities and towns in Sabarkantha district